Histiophryne is a genus of frogfishes found in waters ranging from Taiwan to South Australia.  There are currently five known species.  These fishes are easily distinguished from other anglerfishes as having a reduced (or missing) luring appendage, a highly evolved form of the first dorsal fin spine.

Features

General Body Plan 
Frogfishes have a short, spherical body that is laterally compressed. They have a large mouth that further enlarges when attacking prey. Their fins are similar to legs and are jointed. The ends of the anal and dorsal fins of Histiophryne spread past the bottom of the caudal fin and the tail is frequently curved against the body. Histiophryne have a swim bladder, 20 to 23 vertebrae, and can have raised bumps of skin on the body. They do not have an epural, pseudobranch, caudal peduncle, or dent between the second and third spines.

Dorsal Spines 
Frogfishes have three developed spines on the top of their head. The second and third spines of organisms in the genus Histiophryne look like small bumps because they are attached to the surface of the head with skin. The first spine, the illicium, is found near the snout and is used by frogfish to lure prey. The spine ends with a fleshy tip called the esca. In Histiophryne, the size of the illicium is significantly smaller, frequently covered by skin, and not banded. The esca may be absent in some species of Histiophryne, including H. pogonius and H. psychedelica. If present, the esca is hard to differentiate it from the illicium due to its small size.

Dermal Spinules 
The dermal spinules may or may not be present on species of the genus Histiophryne. If the spinules are present, they are very small and far apart from each other. The illicium does not have any dermal spinules.

Movement 
Frogfishes are sedentary creatures, preferring to wait for prey on the seafloor, but can use a few different methods to move around. They can walk along the seafloor with their pelvic and jointed pectoral fins as well as swim through the water. They have two fundamental walks which resemble the stride of tetrapods. Their ability to walk has been used as evidence for the evolution of fins to limbs within the ocean.  When moving longer distances, the frogfish will swim using one of three methods: subcarangiform swimming, jet propulsion, or “kick-and-glide.” In subcarangiform swimming, the frogfish will keep its fins close to its body and move the body and caudal fin in a back and forth motion. In jet propulsion, the frogfish will inhale a substantial amount of water into its mouth and push it out through its gills. This quick emission of water will move the frogfish forwards. In “kick-and-glide” swimming the frogfish will combine three methods of propulsion to quickly escape predators. The frogfish uses jet propulsion, moves the caudal fin three to five times, and moves the pectoral fins once. Then the frogfish glides by pressing its fins into the body.

Feeding 
Frogfishes camouflage with their surroundings and wait for prey to approach. Frogfishes use their lure to entice prey to come closer, however the illicium is too small in the genus Histiophryne to lure prey. If the prey – even one slightly larger than the frogfish – is close enough, the frogfish will enlarge its mouth and use suction feeding to swallow its prey in a matter of milliseconds. The frogfish will eat a wide variety of prey and is unselective when it comes to their diet. They have even been found to eat their own kind. The frogfish will reject the prey if it is too big or becomes stuck in its mouth.

Reproduction 
The genus Histiophryne has oval-shaped ovaries and lacks a larval stage. Offspring go through parental care and direct development, hatching as relatively large juveniles. The parents carry a small amount of large eggs in an egg cluster, which is held in a pocket. The parent wraps its tail around its body to form this pocket, which is found between the body, pectoral fin, and tail.

Species
There are currently five recognized species in this genus:
 Histiophryne bougainvilli Valenciennes, 1837 (Bougainville's anglerfish)
 Histiophryne cryptacanthus M. C. W. Weber, 1913 (Cryptic anglerfish)
 Histiophryne maggiewalker R. J. Arnold & Pietsch, 2011 (Queensland frogfish) 
 Histiophryne pogonia R. J. Arnold, 2012 
 Histiophryne psychedelica Pietsch, R. J. Arnold & D. J. Hall, 2009

Location 
The genus Histiophryne is found in primarily shallow water within the Indo-Australian Archipelago. The genus is found in the waters surrounding Taiwan, the Philippines, the Maluku Islands, and the southern coast of Australia.

References

Lophiiformes
Fish of Australia
Fish of the Pacific Ocean
Marine fish genera
Taxa named by Theodore Gill